The Becca de Corbassière is a mountain of the Pennine Alps, overlooking Fionnay in the canton of Valais. It lies at the northern end of the chain separating the valley of the Corbassière Glacier from the main valley of Bagnes, north of the Grand Combin.

References

Mountains of the Alps
Mountains of Valais
Mountains of Switzerland
Two-thousanders of Switzerland